Sergio Quintana is a general assignment freelance reporter for KNTV NBC Bay Area News. He joined ABC 7 News in August 2011.

Prior to working for KNTV, he was a reporter at KTVU Channel 2 and a freelance reporter at ABC 7 News/KGO-TV.
As a freelance reporter, Sergio has also produced stories for National Public Radio, Al Jazeera English, and Sirius/XM Satellite Radio.

Career

Quintana began his career in TV and radio in his home state of New Mexico. In college, he began at KUNM, the NPR station in Albuquerque, and later became a news tape editor at KOB-TV, the NBC affiliate in Albuquerque. After graduating from the University of New Mexico, he moved to Roswell, New Mexico to report for KOBR TV.  From Roswell, he moved to Los Alamos, New Mexico as a bureau reporter for KOAT TV. From KOAT he moved to KRQE TV in Albuquerque.

Awards and honors 
Quintana has been awarded fellowships by the Knight Digital Media Foundation at UC Berkeley and the International Center for Journalists in Washington DC.

In 2012, Quintana was elected secretary of the executive board of the National Association of Hispanic Journalists.

References

External links
 Stories covered by Sergio Quintana at KGO TV
 Stories covered by Sergio Quintana at KTVU
 Stories covered by Sergio Quintana at NPR
 Al Jazeera English, Earthrise, "Secret Of Success"
 Al Jazeera English, Earthrise, Flush With Pride
 KTVU wins Peabody Award for BART Shooting story
 NAHJ "Beyond the Border" Fellowship
 Knight Digital Media Center Fellowship
 International Center For Journalists Fellowship

Living people
American television journalists
Year of birth missing (living people)
American male journalists